The Torre Water Catchment, also known as the Hatsuho Water Catchment, is located on what is now Hatsuho Golf Course in Yigo (Piga), Guam. It is a historic site that was listed on the U.S. National Register of Historic Places in 1994. The catchment has an octagonal-shaped exterior made of concrete around limestone gravel and cobbles and has a plastered cylindrical interior. It was built in approximately 1916 by a farmer, Juan dela Torre, to provide water when needed, in a northern area of Guam that is far from regular water supplies.

See also
National Register of Historic Places listings in Guam

References 

Buildings and structures on the National Register of Historic Places in Guam
1916 establishments in Guam
Buildings and structures completed in 1916
Yigo, Guam
Water in Puerto Rico
Water supply infrastructure on the National Register of Historic Places